New York's 27th State Assembly district is one of the 150 districts in the New York State Assembly in the United States. It has been represented by Democrat Daniel Rosenthal since 2017.

Geography 
District 27 is located in Queens, comprising the neighborhoods of Kew Gardens Hills, Kew Gardens, College Point, Malba, and Ponomok.

Recent election results

2022

2020

2018

2017 Special Election

2016

2014

2012

References 

27
Queens, New York